Margaret Conlon (born 17 September 1967) is a former Irish Fianna Fáil politician who served as a Teachta Dála (TD) for the Cavan–Monaghan constituency from 2007 to 2011.

She was elected at the 2007 general election. She lives in Lough Egish in County Monaghan, with her husband Séamus, two sons and one daughter. She is Principal of St Louis Secondary School in Monaghan town. She was a founding member of the Fianna Fáil cumann at NUI Maynooth and was a member of the party's National Executive from 1986 to 1988. She lost her seat at the 2011 general election.

References

 

1967 births
Living people
Alumni of Maynooth University
Fianna Fáil TDs
Irish schoolteachers
Members of the 30th Dáil
Politicians from County Monaghan
21st-century women Teachtaí Dála